Kathleen Belew is an American tenured associate professor of history at Northwestern University, and an international authority on the white-power movement. She is the author of Bring the War Home: The White Power Movement and Paramilitary America (2019), and co-edited A Field Guide to White Supremacy, (2021) with Ramón A. Gutiérrez. Her forthcoming book is titled Home at the End of the World. She has also written for The New York Times, The Washington Post, The Daily Beast, CNN.com, and Dissent and was a CNN contributor.

Academic career 
Belew graduated with a degree in the Comparative History of Ideas from University of Washington in 2005, and a master's degree in 2008 and doctoral degree in 2011 in American Studies from Yale University. She was a professor of U.S. History at the University of Chicago, where she received tenure in 2021, until leaving for Northwestern University in 2022. Her research focuses on race, racism, the white power movement, and militarism in twentieth-century America. Some of Belew's most popular courses include The American Apocalypse, History of the Present, The American Vigilante, and Histories of Violence.

Between 2011 and 2019, there were 16 high-profile attacks linked to white nationalism around the world; 175 people were killed in these attacks. According to Belew: "Too many people still think of these attacks as single events, rather than interconnected actions carried out by domestic terrorists. We spend too much ink dividing them into anti-immigrant, racist, anti-Muslim or antisemitic attacks. True, they are these things. But they are also connected with one another through a broader white power ideology."

In September 2019, Belew was a witness at a congressional hearing on confronting white nationalism. In her witness statement, Belew described the "white power movement" as a "threat to our democracy", said that it was "transnational", and "connected neo-Nazis, Klansmen, skinheads, radical tax protestors, militia members, and others." She advocated forming something like the 2005 Greensboro Truth and Reconciliation Commission as a step towards a solution to the problem. Congressman Jim Jordan and other Republicans criticized Belew after she argued with a conservative witness, Candace Owens.

Works
Bring the War Home: The White Power Movement and Paramilitary America Harvard, 2018. ,

References

External links
 
 
 Kathleen Belew, C-SPAN
 Why alleged New Zealand mosque killer represents a broader 'social movement', PBS, March 15, 2019
 The White Power Movement and The Christchurch Massacre, KPFA 03.19.19
 

1981 births
Living people
University of Washington College of Arts and Sciences alumni
Yale University alumni
Northwestern University faculty
University of Chicago faculty
21st-century American women writers
21st-century American historians
American women historians
White nationalism in the United States